Mega Builders is a documentary television series appearing on the Discovery Channel and Science Channel. Each episode takes a look into the people and the machines involved into the construction of many huge engineering projects.

Episode list

Season 1

Season 2

Season 3

Season 4

Season 5

Reception

See also 
Extreme Engineering
Megastructures (TV series)
Ultimate Factories

External links
 
 

Engineering projects
Discovery Channel (Canada) original programming
Documentary television series about industry
Construction in the United States
Channel 5 (British TV channel) original programming
2005 Canadian television series debuts
2010 Canadian television series endings
2000s Canadian documentary television series